The Federal Correctional Institution, Victorville (FCI Victorville Medium I & II) are two medium-security United States federal prisons for male inmates in Victorville, California. Part of the Victorville Federal Prison Complex, it is operated by the Federal Bureau of Prisons, a division of the United States Department of Justice.

Description
FCI Victorville Medium are two medium-security United States federal prisons for male inmates in Victorville, California. Part of the Victorville Federal Prison Complex, it is operated by the Federal Bureau of Prisons, a division of the United States Department of Justice. There is an adjacent satellite prison camp for low-security female inmates. The complex is located on land that was formerly part of George Air Force Base.

It was built on a Superfund site, which has contaminated the region's water supply with industrial solvents like trichlorethylene, and pesticides like dieldrin and aldrin, and chemicals from jet fuel.

Notable incidents
In 2010, Scott A. Holencik, 45, the warden of FCI Victorville, was named in a six-count indictment returned by a federal grand jury. The indictment accused Holencik of lying to special agents of the United States Department of Justice, Office of the Inspector General, when he was interviewed in November 2009 in connection with an investigation into Internet postings that disclosed confidential government information. The indictment charged Holencik with two felony counts of making false statements when he denied making posts to www.prisonofficer.org. Holencik allegedly made multiple posts to the website that contained sensitive information concerning criminal investigations at the prison. Specifically, it is alleged that he disclosed confidential government information concerning a Bureau of Prisons employee who was suspected of being involved with an inmate gambling scheme, as well as facts related to a homicide that occurred at the prison in August 2009.

A federal judge, Virginia Phillips, subsequently ruled that the information posted on prisonofficer.org was not confidential, thereby dismissing those charges. No court date has been set for Holencik's trial on the lying to federal investigators charge. Holencik retired as warden. 

On February 20, 2014, federal Judge Virginia Phillips ruled dismissing the remaining counts of the indictment against Holencik with prejudice.

On May 31, 2016, inmate Fazliddin Kurbanov snuck behind then-warden Calvin Johnson and attempted to slit his throat with a 4-inch shank he concealed, injuring him in the process. Kurbanov, an Uzbek refugee, was serving a 25-year sentence for material support and plotting a bombing attack while working as truck-driving instructor in Salt Lake City, Utah. Kurbanov was charged with attempted murder of a federal officer and sentenced to an additional 20 years in prison in 2018. He is now serving his sentence at ADX Florence.

In popular culture
In the first episode of the HBO television series Luck, the main character Chester "Ace" Bernstein, played by Dustin Hoffman, is released from federal custody after serving 3 years at FCI Victorville.

The main protagonist “Diablo”, played by Gino Silva, in A Man Apart (2003) featuring Vin Diesel, was incarcerated at Victorville Penitentiary.

Notable inmates

Current

Former

See also

List of U.S. federal prisons
Federal Bureau of Prisons
Incarceration in the United States

References

Buildings and structures in San Bernardino County, California
Federal Correctional Institutions in the United States
Prisons in California
Victor Valley
Victorville, California
Government buildings completed in 2004
2004 establishments in California